Sułków , is a village in southern Poland, in Opole Voivodeship, Głubczyce County, Gmina Baborów.

The name of the village comes from the Old Polish male name Sulisław. The oldest known mention of the village dates back to 1340, when it was purchased by Euphemia of Racibórz, local Polish princess of the Piast dynasty. Between 1871 and 1945 it was part of Germany, however, in the late 19th century the local population was entirely Polish and predominantly Catholic. In 1936 the German administration changed the name to Zinnatal to erase traces of Polish origin. The original Polish name was restored after the village became again part of Poland after the defeat of Nazi Germany in World War II in 1945.

Notable people 
 Feliks Steuer (1889–1950), Polish linguist, born in the village

References 

Villages in Głubczyce County